Cédric Liabeuf (born August 5, 1979 in Châteaurenard) is a French professional football player. Currently, he plays in the Championnat National for Uzès Pont du Gard.

1979 births
Living people
French footballers
Ligue 1 players
Ligue 2 players
Championnat National players
Stade de Reims players
Le Mans FC players
Stade Brestois 29 players
En Avant Guingamp players
Vannes OC players
SO Romorantin players
ES Uzès Pont du Gard players
Association football midfielders